Alex Kim (born December 20, 1978) is a professional tennis player from the United States.

Early career
In the 1996 US Open, Kim and Mexico's Mariano Sánchez made the boys' doubles semi-finals, where they lost to the Bryan brothers.

He began playing collegiate tennis in 1998, for Stanford University. The American was a member of the championship winning Stanford sides of 1998 and 2000. In the latter year, he also won the NCAA Division 1 singles title and was an All-American. He and teammate Geoff Abrams formed the top-ranked doubles team in the nation in 2000, and were named the ITA National Doubles Team of the Year. He was inducted into the Stanford Athletic Hall of Fame in 2011.

ATP Tour
Given a wildcard entry, Kim made his first Grand Slam appearance in 2000, at the US Open. He had the misfortune of being drawn against world number one Andre Agassi in the first round and lost in straight sets.  In June 2000, he won the doubles title with Geoff Abrams at the USTA Chandler Cup Futures.

The next time that he played in a Grand Slam event, the 2002 Australian Open, he put in the best performance of his career, starting with an opening round win over Davide Sanguinetti. Despite being ranked outside of the world's top 200, Kim managed to defeat fourth seed Yevgeny Kafelnikov in the second round, without dropping a set. In the third round, he was eliminated by the only other qualifier remaining in the draw, Fernando Gonzalez.

He also played at the US Open in 2002, but lost in the first round to Greg Rusedski. In Washington's Legg Mason Tennis Classic that year, he claimed a win over another big name player, 10th seed Todd Martin. He was unable to get past Jarkko Nieminen in the round of 16.

In 2003, he played in three Grand Slam tournaments, but lost in the opening round of each. He was beaten by Scott Draper in the Australian Open, squandered a two set lead in losing to Mark Philippoussis in the French Open and was defeated by Younes El Aynaoui in the US Open.

Kim was a joint bronze medalist in the men's singles event at the 2003 Pan American Games, which were held in the Dominican Republic. He lost in the semi-finals to Marcelo Rios, in a match decided by two tiebreaks.

As a doubles player, Kim competed in the 2002 US Open with Kevin Kim (who is of no relation) and with Jeff Salzenstein in the 2003 US Open. He and his partner lost in the first round of each.

Challenger titles

Singles: (3)

Doubles: (1)

References

External links
 
 
 

1978 births
Living people
American male tennis players
Stanford Cardinal men's tennis players
Tennis people from Maryland
Tennis players at the 2003 Pan American Games
Sportspeople from Delray Beach, Florida
American sportspeople of Korean descent
Pan American Games bronze medalists for the United States
Pan American Games medalists in tennis
Medalists at the 2003 Pan American Games